The Prix Abd-el-Tif (Abd-el-Tif prize) was a French art prize that was awarded annually from 1907–1961. It was modelled on the Prix de Rome, a scholarship that enabled French artists to stay in Rome.

The award was devised in 1907 by Léonce Bénédite, curator of the Museum of Luxembourg and Charles Jonnart, governor-general of French Algeria. The prize comprised a bursary and a year's free stay at the Villa Abd-el-Tif in Algiers, a state-owned institution for the study of Islamic art. Each year's prize winners were chosen by the Society of French Orientalist Painters.

Prize winners
 1907 : Léon Cauvy (1874–1933), painter, and Paul Jouve (1880–1973), animal painter and sculptor
 1908 : Jacques Simon (1875–1965), painter. Pierre Poisson (1876–1953), sculptor
 1909 : Léon Carré (1878–1942), painter, and Jules Migonney (1876–1929)
 1910 : Charles Dufresne (1875–1938), painter, and Henri Villain (1878–1938), painter
 1911 : Adolphe Beaufrere (1876–1960), painter and engraver
 1912 : Charles Bigonet (1877–1931), sculptor and Gustave Hierholtz (1877–1948), sculptor
 1913 : Marius de Buzon (1879–1958), painter, André Chapuy (1882–1941), painter and engraver
 1914 : Charles-René Darrieux, painter, Albert Pommier (1880–1944), sculptor
 1920 : Paul Élie Dubois (1886–1949), painter, and Jean Launois (1898–1942), painter
 1921 : Maurice Bouviolle (1893–1971), painter and 1921 : Jean Bouchaud (1891–1977), painter
 1922 : Pierre Deval (1897–1993), painter, and Ludovic Pineau (1886–1935), sculptor
 1923 : Jacques Denier (1894–1983), painter, and Jean Désiré Bascoules (1886–1976), painter
 1924 : Étienne Bouchaud (1898–1989), painter, and André Rigal (1888–1953), painter and sculptor
 1925 : Louis Berthomme Saint André (1905–1977), painter, and Eugène Corneau (1894–1975), painter and engraver
 1926 : Louis Riou (1893–1958), painter
 1927 : Louis Dideron (1901–1980), sculptor, and André Thomas Rouault (1899–1949), painter and decorator
 1928 : René Levrel (1900–1981), painter, and Luc Rousseau (1899–1958), painter
 1929 : Pierre-Eugène Clairin (1897–1980), painter, and Georges Halbout du Tanney (1895–1986), sculptor
 1930 : Henri Clamens (1905–1937), painter, and André Hébuterne (1894–1979), painter
 1931 : Pierre Farrey (1896–1987), painter, and Jacques Wolf (1896–1956), painter
 1932 : Marcel Damboise (1932–1992), sculptor and Richard Maguet (1896–1940), painter
 1933 : André Hambourg (1909–1999), painter, and Émile Bouneau (1902–1970), painter
 1934 : Francois Caujan (1902–1945), sculptor, Roger Nivelt (1899–1962), painter
 1935 : Emile Sabouraud (1900–1996), painter, and Jean Hustel (1906–1991), painter
 1936 : René Gilles (1910–?), painter, and Jean Meunier (1903–?), architect
 1937 : Camille Leroy (1905–1995), painter, and Antoine Ferrari (1910–1995),
 1938 : Jean Beaunier (1908–1947), painter, and Edgard Pillet (1912–1997), painter and sculptor
 1939 : Pierre Lepage (1906–1983), painter, and Jean-André Cante (1912–1977), painter
 1942 : André Bourdil, (1911–1982), painter, and Jean-Eugene Bersier (1895–1980), painter and engraver
 1945 : Georges Le Poitevin (1912–1992), painter, and Francois Fauck (1911–1979), painter
 1946 : Maurice Boitel (1919–2007), painter, and André Beauce (1911–1974), painter
 1947 : Jean Marie Chabot (1914–2015), painter, and Paul Ragueneau (1913–1986), painter
 1948 : Jean Pierre Cornet (? ), painter and engraver, and Pierre Quiniou (1920–2015), painter and engraver
 1949 : Jacques Houplain (1920–2020), engraver, and Jean Carton  (1912–1988), sculptor
 1950 : Pierre Brandel, painter,(1912–2003), and Gabriel Bougrain 
 1951 : Pierre Pruvost (1921–2008), painter, and Jean Menoucoutin, sculptor died at the Villa Abd-el-Tif in 1953
 1952 : Pierre Parsus (1921–), painter, and Jean Vimenet (1914–1999)
 1953 : Robert Martin (1925–2001), painter
 1954 : Jack Chambrin (1919–1983), painter, and François Cacheux (1923–2011), sculptor
 1955 : Jean Gachet, painter (1920–2003)
 1956 : Jean-Pierre Blanche (1927–), painter, Gisèle.Georges-Mianes dite G.Georges - Mianes first woman laureate (1928–), painter, Jean-Marie Albagnac (1931–), engraver and photographer
 1957 : Hubert le Mab (1924–), painter
 1958 : Marc Gruais (1932–), painter, and Gérard Roland (1932–), painter
 1959 : Jean Bellenger, (1925–2017), painter
 1960 : Pierre Clément (1923–2011), painter, Pierre Telliez (1932–), and Gauthier known as Gartier Pierre (1930–2016), painter
 1961 : Victor Candale - did not stay in Algeria
 1961 : Françoise Naudet, sculptor - did not stay in Algeria

See also

 List of European art awards

References

Visual arts awards
Algerian culture
Arts in Algeria
Awards established in 1907
1907 establishments in Algeria
Awards disestablished in 1961
1961 disestablishments in Africa